In feudal Europe, a corporation (from the Latin ,  a body) 
 
was an aggregation of business interests into a single legal body, entity or compact, usually with an explicit license from city, church, or national leaders.  These functioned as effective monopolies for a particular good or labor.

The term "corporation" was used as late as the 18th century in England to refer to such ventures as the East India Company or the Hudson's Bay Company: commercial organizations that operated under royal patent to have exclusive rights to a particular area of trade.  In the medieval town, however, corporations were a conglomeration of interests that existed either as a development from, or in competition with, guilds.  The most notable corporations were in trade and banking.

The effects of a corporation were similar to a monopoly.  On the one hand, the ability to have sole access to markets meant that the business was encouraged (e.g., the ability to be an exclusive trader provided an incentive to the East India Company to accept financial risks in exploration) and the negative effects of competition were avoided (to take the same example, exclusive patents cut down on merchants sponsoring piracy).  Innovation was stifled, however, and prices were unregulated.  (In the case of patent corporations, the town or monarch was ostensibly able to regulate prices by revoking the patent, but this rarely occurred.)

See also 

 Guild
 Guilds of Brussels
 Bourgeois of Brussels
 Bourgeois of Paris
 Corporatism

References

Feudalism
Guilds
Corporatism